Asgaard – German Security Group (founded in 2007) is a German private military company.

In May 2010, Asgaard secured a contract with Somali politician Ahmad Galadid Abdinur Darman, which in turn sparked controversy in Germany. According to spokespersons for the German Institute for International and Security Affairs and the Düsseldorf Institute for Foreign and Security Policy, Darman is a politically unimportant player in Somalia, whose political clout may change considerably if he acquires armed security. That over a hundred former German soldiers would begin to play a part in Somali politics led to discussion in the German Bundestag. Politicians spoke of a "fall from grace," but there appeared to be little that could be done, since the German government had for years neglected to draw up rules for private military companies.

In June 2010 the chairman of the Reservist Association of the Bundeswehr, major Gerd Höfer, wrote a letter to Asgaards manager Thomas Kaltegärtner and asked him to resign from the association. Kaltegärtner is staff sergeant in reserve.

Somalia 
On May 23, 2010, the Tagesschau reported that German mercenaries from the security company Asgaard are intervening in the civil war in Somalia and are supposed to help Darman come to power there. Moreover, they should for his protection and the protection of his clan ensure that train military and police and fight against militias. A letter from "President Darman" to Kaltegärtner from January 2010 shows that Asgaard was authorized to import weapons and equipment into Somalia. Residents of Telgte, the then headquarters of the company, protested against the "mercenaries from the Münsterland" with torchlight parades.

The conclusion of the contract led to further conflicts, for example because the German government supported Somalia's interim government, among other things as part of the European Union's training mission in Uganda, but the German company Asgaard was supposed to enforce Darman's claim to power and thus act against Germany's interests  

The company's Facebook page announced in September 2010 that California Governor Arnold Schwarzenegger had encouraged Asgaard in his ambitions. In 2010, the Münster public prosecutor's office started investigations against Kaltegärtner, who examined whether Asgaard had violated Section 109h of the Strafgesetzbuch], which forbids recruiting Germans for military service with a foreign power, and also a violation of the United Nations] embargo against Somalia. In this context, raids took place in nine objects, in which extensive material, including the contract between Asgaard and Darman, as well as several thousand rounds of ammunition were confiscated. A penalty order was issued against two Asgaard employees. Gaßmann was also investigated for violating the Foreign Trade Act. The chairman of Reservist Association of Deutsche Bundeswehr, Gerd Höfer, then asked Kaltegärtner to leave the association.

Aimed Cooperation with the Bundeswehr 
According to a response from the federal government to a small question from the Die Linke parliamentary group, Asgaard has tried twice to get orders from the German Armed Forces since 2009, but there has been no cooperation.

In 2015, Asgaard had repeatedly tried to get an order to protect the Bundeswehr's contingent in Erbil, and in this case, too, there was no cooperation. In contrast to other security companies, Asgaard did not sponsor vocational training measures either.

On October 20, 2021, the spokesman for the Federal Ministry of Defense explained that there was a ban on all members of the Federal Armed Forces with the Asgaard company.

Iraq 
In September 2014, Stoy and Gaßmann were spotted near the Iraqi city of Erbil , where they say they have accompanied journalists. At the same time, they were looking for at least three helicopter pilots for Asgaard to retrain on the Camcopter S-100 helicopter reconnaissance drone, which will be trained for two months at Boeing in the US and then in the Ukraine. After the training, assignments "in Iraq and other crisis areas" are possible.

In June 2021, Gaßmann made public that the former employee of the Hamm-based ASGAARD German Security Guards - Consulting GmbH, Bilaal Zaher, held at least US$10 million from a business account during his time as managing director of the Iraqi branch and after its termination and revocation of all powers of attorney allegedly embezzled in Iraq. and through the Grauhaus Germany GmbH, which also belongs to Zaher, is said to have partially invested in a controversial mask deal with the Federal Ministry of Health by Jens Spahn.

Training at fire service training centers 
In 2017, an investigation was ordered in Ahlen to clarify why Asgaard was able to use the premises and the premises of the fire department training center Ahlen-Brockhausen (FAS) for training purposes. Asgaard then warned in the form of an open letter that the FAS would have an annual income of more than 20,000 euros and demanded a “constructive solution-oriented approach”. According to the city spokesman, the agreement was made between Asgaard and the “Arbeitsgemeinschaft Feuerwehrausbildungsstätte Brockhausen”, which is owned by the city of Ahlen. As a result of the investigation, further use was prevented.

Networks around Asgaard and allegations of right-wing extremism 
In September 2020, various media reported that Asgaard was influenced by right-wing extremists and is supposed to maintain a network that extends into the Bundeswehr and several German security authorities at federal and state level. Kontraste and Der Spiegel are also video recordings from Baghdad from 2017, in which, for example, an Reichskriegsflagge on the wall in Asgaardand the drawing of a Wehrmacht soldier can be seen. According to statements by former and active employees, Gaßmann is said to have repeatedly made racist statements, engaged in political agitation and, questioned the legitimacy of the Federal Republic of Germany. According to statements by his business partner in Iraq, Bilaal Zaher, Gaßmann is said to have made hostile statements about Martina Renner, a member of the Bundestag from the Left Party. Zaher declared in lieu of oath, for example, statements by Gaßmann that Ms. Renner would have to be eliminated if the government were to be overthrown.

Parts of the network around Asgaard include the soldier Matthias D., who is stationed in the Tollense barracks in Neubrandenburg, who has been observed by the Military Counterintelligence Service (MAD) for "suspected right-wing extremism" since 2018 and the is suspected of having prepared a serious act of violence that is dangerous to the state in accordance with Section 89 a of the Criminal Code. Matthias D.'s passport was revoked after he had traveled several times to the Middle East and Beirut and an Asgaard uniform was found in his luggage. On September 14, 2020, the public prosecutor's office searched the residential and business premises of D. As well as a Frankfurt detective who, during his vacation time and without the knowledge of his employer, worked at least twice in a managerial position for the Asgaard company in Iraq. The police officer is also accused of bribery and violation of official secrecy by the public prosecutor, as he is said to have carried out unlawful inquiries from police databases for his personal and Asgaard's benefit. He was also responsible for the safekeeping of evidence and, after an examination of the evidence by the internal audit department in March 2021, is suspected of having embezzled and sold “pistols, revolvers and long guns and ammunition in the three-digit range”. Some of the weapons are said to have been passed on to companies. The detective inspector was prohibited from conducting official business and his permanent removal from the service is being examined. Hesse's Interior Minister Peter Beuth announced that criminal as well as a disciplinary action would be taken against the police officer with all possible means and that a police officer at Asgaard, neither in an approved nor in an unapproved sideline, had anything to do with. He further explained that "are the Hessian investigators in a close cooperation with the security authorities of the Federation and the countries and thereby also consider how much from the current here investigations indicate possible other crimes in connection with the security company from NRW result."

After several searches of the business premises, most recently in August 2020, the business premises of Asgaard and the private apartment of the managing director in Dolberg (Ahlen) searched by the Federal Criminal Police Office and the police with the help of a dog squad from Thuringia and a helicopter on February 18, 2021. According to the spokesman for the Federal Public Prosecutor's Office in Wiesbaden, the operation took place on the basis of a decision by the Federal Court of Justice and was in connection with an investigation by the Federal Prosecutor's Office because of the initial suspicion of a serious criminal offense.

The federal prosecutor arrested Arend-Adolf G. and Achim A. in October 2021 on suspicion of founding a terrorist organization. Both are former members of the Bundeswehr and both are said to have been active for Asgaard. Arend-Adolf G. is also said to have worked as a managing director for Asgaard.   On October 20, 2021, the Tagesthemen published a video clip that shows Dirk Gaßmann, Achim A. and Arend-Adolf G. together in Iraq singing songs from the Nazi era. Achim A. presents photos on his company homepage that show him, together with Dirk Gaßmann and Arend-Adolf G., on a front inspection in Iraq. Achim A. is a foreign and security policy advisor for the CSU in the Munich district association. On the website of Asgaard Nigeria of which Petja Stoy is the managing director   Petja Stoy and Achim A. can be seen together in Nigeria under the topic "Consulting and Project Planning".

Ownership and corporate structure 
The company has existed in various forms since at least 2004. Asgaard German Security Guards, registered in the commercial register, was deleted in 2008 after bankruptcy proceedings were rejected. Managing Director Kaltegärtner subsequently did not register a trad- in Telgte from 2008 to 2010, and there was no entry in the commercial register in June 2010 either. After the affair surrounding the planned Somalia mission, Asgaard briefly had an office in Leipzig at Virchowstrasse 27. Reinhard Rade and Adrian Preißinger were also registered at this address. Reinhard Rades company THG, Technische Handelsgesellschaft mbH was also registered there. Telgte's headquarters were later relocated to the Irish city of Cork and registered there. In 2011 they moved to Dolberg (Ahlen) to the residence of Dirk Gaßmann. On July 24, 2014, Asgaard was re-established under the old name, relocated the company headquarters to Uentrop (Hamm) in 2016 and later to Aachen under the name "Asgaard Security Guards Consulting GmbH". At the beginning of 2017, the company's headquarters were relocated to Hamm. According to its own statement, there is a general agency in Nigeria and an office in Portugal. The first management consisted of Thomas Kaltegärtner, Dirk Gaßmann joined in January 2008 at the latest. After Kaltegärtner officially left the company, the Asgaard management declared that "they had nothing more to do with the company at that time". The previous owner Gaßmann is, besides Stoy (since at least March 2013  ), still one of the shareholders.

In March 2019, the former Respect! Management GmbH from Berlin renamed Asgaard German Security Group GmbH and the headquarters relocated to Hamm. Bilaal Zaher was temporarily the sole owner of this company, from August 2019 to December 2020 Dirk Gaßmann was also a partial owner.

There are two companies in January 2021: Asgaard German Security Group GmbH with Zaher as managing director and Asgaard German Security Guards Consulting GmbH with Gaßmann as managing director. All other previous owners or partners have left the various companies.

Rockmart Holding Inc. has held a 49% stake in Asgaard German Security Guard Consulting GmbH since January 2021, with Andreas Kunz being the sole managing director.

In February 2021, Asgaard German Security Group GmbH was back in Respect! Management GmbH was renamed and the headquarters relocated to Berlin. The sole managing director is Bilaal Zaher.

Literature 

 Dirk Laabs: Public enemies in uniform. How militant rights subvert our institutions . Ullstein book publishers, Berlin 2021, ISBN 978-3-430-21032-4

References

External links 
 Asgaard-gsg.de, official Homepage
 Söldner werden – mithilfe des Staates. Umschulung wird subventioniert.

German companies established in 2007
Companies based in North Rhine-Westphalia
Private military contractors
Security consulting firms